The College of Engineering is a faculty at the University of Saskatchewan in Saskatoon, Saskatchewan, Canada.

"The College of Engineering is located on Treaty 6 Territory and the Homeland of the Métis, and we pay our respect to the First Nations and Métis ancestors of this place and reaffirm our relationship with one another."

History 
The "School of Engineering" officially started about five years after the University of Saskatchewan being established. In 1912, the University administrations decided to gather closely related courses under one title.

Early days 
In 1912, the "School of Engineering" was founded. In that time, only civil engineering courses were offered to six students by Professor C.J. Mackenzie. The first Bachelors of Engineering degrees in civil engineering were awarded on April 26, 1916 to only three students.

October 28, 1920 marked the opening of the new engineering building. In 1925, a big fire destroyed the building. A new construction was built at the same place and it was opened in 1926.

The Great Depression and WWII 
During the 30s, the tuition fees was raised. The College adopted the coat of arms, and new programs were incorporated (chemical engineering in 1931, and Geological and engineering physics in 1937).

The 1940s brought more changes, due to the value of engineering to war effort, the College became the largest on campus for the first time. The department of electrical engineering was created. At this time, the first female student graduated.

In 1952–53, petroleum engineering was introduced.

Departments 
 Chemical and Biological Engineering
 Civil, Geological and Environmental Engineering
 Electrical and Computer Engineering
 Mechanical Engineering
 Division of Biomedical Engineering

Degrees 
 Biological Engineering (MSc and PhD)
 Biomedical Engineering (PGD, MEng, MSc, and PhD)
 Chemical Engineering (BE, MEng, MSc, and PhD)
 Civil Engineering (BE, MEng, MSc, and PhD)
 Computer Engineering (BE, dual BE & BSc, PGD, MEng, MSc, and PhD)
 Electrical Engineering (BE, dual BE & BSc, P.G.D, MEng, MSc, and PhD)
 Engineering Physics (BE, dual BE & BSc, MSc, and PhD)
 Environmental Engineering (BE)
 Geological Engineering (BE)
 Mechanical Engineering (BE, PGD, MEng, MSc, and PhD)

Student groups 

 Saskatoon Engineering Student Society (SESS)
 Engineering Graduate Course Council (EGCC)

Student discipline groups 
 Chemical Engineering Student Society (ChESS)
 Civil Engineering Student Society (CSCE)
 Environmental Engineering Student Society (ENVESS)
 Geological Engineering Student Society (GESS) 
 Institute of Electrical and Electronics Engineers (IEEE) Usask Student Chapter 
 Mechanical Engineering Student Association (MESA)
 Physics Student Society (PSS)

Student design teams 
 Huskie Formula Racing (SAE)
 Steel Bridge Design Team
 USask Aero Design Team
 USask Sled Dogs Quarter-Scale Tractor Team
 USask Space Design Team (USST)

Faculty Members and staff 
 Ajay Dalai,FRSC, chemical
 Charles Colbourn, computer science
 C.J. Mackenzie,CC CMG MC FRS FRSC, civil
 Ding Yu Peng, chemical 
 Nabil Esmail, chemical
 Roy Billinton,FRSC, electrical
 Safa Kasap, electrical

Alumni 
 Carson Morrison, P.Eng., Engineering Institute of Canada Fellow, Canadian Silver Jubilee Medal, Ontario Engineering Society Order of Honour, Canadian Standards Association Jean-Paul Carriere Award.
 C. Donald Bateman, BEng, inventor of the Ground Proximity Warning System (GPWS), a device that is responsible for a marked decline in controlled flight into terrain accidents.
 Daryl "Doc" Seaman, OC, BSc Mechanical Engineering, LL.D, honorary Doctor of Laws – businessman; one of the "100 Alumni of Influence" from the U of S
 H. D. Barber, BSc, MSc – founder of Electrical Engineering Canadian; CEO of Gennum Corporation
Fred Mannering, BEng, Professor University of South Florida, Clarivate Highly Cited Researcher
 Jim MacNeill, OC consultant, environmentalist, and international public servant
 M. F. Firouzabad, BEng ,MSc, PhD, president of Sharif University of Technology
 W. Brett Wilson, BEng, MBA, Hon. LL.D., OC, S.O.M. – entrepreneur, philanthropist; former Dragon's Den panelist; co-founder of FirstEnergy Capital; founder, President, and Chairman of Prairie Merchant Capital; Chairman of Canoe Financial

See also 
 Academic programs at the University of Saskatchewan
List of universities in Canada#Saskatchewan

References 

University of Saskatchewan
University and college buildings completed in 1982
Educational institutions established in 1912
1912 establishments in Saskatchewan